Paynes Bay, sometimes called the "Platinum Coast", is located on the west coast of Barbados.  Many locals believe that it is one of the island's best swimming beaches for both the calm seas of the Caribbean (in comparison to the strong south or east coast surf) and the colorful neighborhood.  In recent years, Paynes Bay has experienced significant development, most recently by various foreign speculators who are in the process of constructing condominiums along the bay.

The resort Sandy Lane is situated at the northern end of Paynes Bay, and there are many luxury villas located along this part of the west coast. Paynes Bay also has many restaurants.

See also
List of beaches in Barbados

References

Bays of Barbados
Beaches of Barbados